Soulamea terminalioides is a species of plant in the Simaroubaceae family. It is endemic to Seychelles.

References

terminalioides
Vulnerable plants
Endemic flora of Seychelles
Taxonomy articles created by Polbot